Paristiopterus labiosus, the giant boarfish, is a species of armorhead native to the coastal waters of southern Australia, and New Zealand. It is a commercially important species.

References

Pentacerotidae
Fish described in 1872
Taxa named by Albert Günther